Thompson Creek is a  long 1st order tributary to the Ararat River in Patrick County, Virginia.

Course
Thompson Creek rises on the Pine Creek divide in Patrick County about 1 mile southwest of Bell Spur, Virginia.  Thompson Creek then flows west and makes a turn south to join the Ararat River about 0.5 miles west of Bell Spur.

Watershed
Thompson Creek drains  of area, receives about 55.8 in/year of precipitation, has a wetness index of 258.12, and is about 76% forested.

See also
List of rivers of Virginia

References

Rivers of Virginia
Rivers of Patrick County, Virginia